The boys' singles of the tournament 2009 BWF World Junior Championships was held on 28 October–1 November 2009. Chinese player, Tian Houwei took out the boys' singles final as he defeated Iskandar Zulkarnain Zainuddin from Malaysia in straight sets.

Seeds 

  Tian Houwei (champion)
  Iskandar Zulkarnain Zainuddin (final)
  Syawal Ismail (third round)
  Hsu Jen-Hao (semi-final)
  Jamie van Hooijdonk (third round)
  Ramdan Misbun (quarter-final)
  Li Yisheng (quarter-final)
  Emil Holst (quarter-final)
  Kasper Lehikoinen (third round)
  Nikolaj Persson (fourth round)
  Mattias Borg (second round)
  Pisit Poodchalat (fourth round)
  Sai Praneeth (fourth round)
  Jordy Hilbink (third round)
  Zulfadli Zulkiffli (fourth round)
  Lê Hà Anh (second round)

Draw

Finals

Top half

Section 1

Section 2

Section 3

Section 4

Bottom half

Section 5

Section 6

Section 7

Section 8

References

2009 BWF World Junior Championships